"Little Bones" is a song by The Tragically Hip. The song was released as the lead single from the band's second studio album, Road Apples, on which it appears as the opening track. The song was very successful in Canada, peaking at No. 11 on the Canadian RPM Singles chart. It is one of the band's most popular songs and still receives consistent airplay on Canadian rock radio stations.

There is also a The Tragically Hip tribute band from Ottawa, Ontario, named "Little Bones".

Charts

Weekly charts

Year-end charts

References

External links

1991 singles
The Tragically Hip songs
1991 songs
MCA Records singles
Sire Records singles